Astérix is the name of three 1993 platform games for the Nintendo Entertainment System, Super NES and Game Boy. The game are based on the comic book series Asterix, and are part of a series of games based on this license. These games were only made available in PAL format due to their exclusive European release.

Gameplay

The player controls the short and mustached Gaul who has to progress through levels located all across Europe, fighting Romans and various aggressive animals along the way, to rescue his friend Obelix before Caesar throws him to the lions. The gameplay takes place in 50 BC. Gaul is entirely occupied by the Romans. One small Gaulish village continues to defy the occupying forces, thanks to a magic potion which makes them invincible. But now Obelix has vanished. The Romans have confirmed his capture and taken him to an unknown destination.

Reception

Both Asterix and The Smurfs were much more popular in Europe, and most of the games in their respective series never made it over into the North American market.

See also
List of Asterix games

References

1993 video games
Europe-exclusive video games
Game Boy games
Game Boy-only games
Infogrames games
Nintendo Entertainment System games
Platform games|w
Super Nintendo Entertainment System games
Super Nintendo Entertainment System-only games
Video games based on Asterix
Video games developed in Spain
Video games scored by Alberto Jose González
Video games set in Egypt
Video games set in Europe
Video games set in France
Video games set in Greece
Video games set in Rome
Video games set in Switzerland
Video games set in the 1st century BC
Video games set in the Roman Empire
Single-player video games